Benjamin Alan "Ben" Paton (born May 5, 2000) is a Canadian professional soccer player who plays for Ross County in the Scottish Premiership.

Club career

Early career 
In 2016, Paton joined the youth academy of Blackburn Rovers, after trialing the year previous. In March 2018 Blackburn signed Paton to a professional contract. In June 2021 it was announced that Paton would not be retained by the club.

Ross County 
On July 8, 2021 Scottish Premiership club Ross County announced they had signed Paton to a deal, joining his older brother Harry. He made his professional debut for The Staggies on August 22 against Rangers.

In January 2023 Paton suffered a cruciate ligament injury during a training session, ruling him out for nine months.

International career
Paton has represented Canada at the under-17 level and was part of a squad that faced Jamaica in November 2016.

Career statistics

References

External links
 Ben Paton profile at Canada Soccer

Living people
2000 births
Canadian soccer players
Association football midfielders
Ross County F.C. players
Scottish Professional Football League players
Soccer people from Ontario
Sportspeople from Kitchener, Ontario
Canada men's youth international soccer players
Blackburn Rovers F.C. players
Canadian expatriate soccer players
Expatriate footballers in England
Expatriate footballers in Scotland
Canadian expatriate sportspeople in England
Canadian expatriates in Scotland